Ina Marija Bartaitė (2 May 1996 – 7 April 2021) was a Lithuanian film actress. She was known for, among others, Peace to Us in Our Dreams and Seneca's Day.

Since a young age Bartaitė has been following her fathers, Šarūnas Bartas, footsteps acting in many films and accompanying her father to many award ceremonies. The first film Bartaitė has ever appeared in was Visions of Europe. An anthology film with a collection of short film projects by different directors. Her own father directed and wrote the segment "Children Loose Nothing" which Bartaitė had played in.

In 2016 at the Vilnius International Film Festival Kino pavasaris, Bartaitė was nominated for Best Lithuanian Actress for the role in Peace to Us in Our Dreams. As of recently, Bartaitė had played a role in Bojena Horackova film Walden. It is a story about young girl Jana, played by Bartaitė, who after twenty-five years of exile in Paris returns to Vilnius, wanting to find the lake that Paulius, her first lover, called "Walden".

Bartaitė finished her high school years in Vilnius, and then went on to study in Vilnius University for French Philology. She then went on to study acting in Paris. At the time of her death, Bartaitė lived at Valakampiai with her ill grandmother that had raised her since birth. In an interview Bartaitė had stated that she spoke French and that she traveled to Paris often, as her sister Anastasija lived there with whom she spoke French.  She also stated in the same interview that she had never thought to become an actress, not until her father suggested to be in one of his films, stating  "It was an idea to live out, and I decided to join in on".

She was the only daughter of Šarūnas Bartas and Yekaterina Golubeva. Bartaitė died at the scene of a traffic collision on 7 April 2021, aged 24. She was travelling back home. It was later revealed that the drunk driver who hit Bartaitė while she was riding her bicycle is the son of a Lithuanian politician and former member of Seimas. The sudden death of Bartaitė has sent a shock wave through the family and the people Bartaitė has worked through the years. A friend of Bartaitės, Denisas Kolomickis, has stated, "Ina was a unique in her field of work, unique she was as a person: phenomenally talented, sensative, philosophical". Bartaitės co-star on the film Mon légionnaire Aleksandr Kuznestov posted a tribute on Instagram after her death, writing "You hugged me with a very long hug, than looked in my drunk eyes and said "I think I love you as a person". It was your last words to me".

Filmography 

 Visions of Europe (2004)
Peace to Us in Our Dreams (2015)
I Am Katya Golubeva (2016)
 Seneca's Day (2016)
 Walden (2020)
Our Men (2021)

References

External links

UniFrance

21st-century Lithuanian actresses
Lithuanian film actresses
1996 births
2021 deaths
Lithuanian people of Russian descent
Year of birth uncertain
Road incident deaths in Lithuania